Chinameca is a municipality in the San Miguel Department of El Salvador. The Chinameca Volcano rises over the town.

Sports
Chinameca is home to Salvadoran Third Division club C.D. Águila San Isidro, who play at the Hacienda San Isidro at 1,250 meters above sea level.

References

Municipalities of the San Miguel Department (El Salvador)